Hypohidrosis is a disorder in which a person exhibits diminished sweating in response to appropriate stimuli. In contrast with hyperhidrosis, which is a socially troubling yet often benign condition, the consequences of untreated hypohidrosis include hyperthermia, heat stroke and death. An extreme case of hypohidrosis in which there is a complete absence of sweating and the skin is dry is termed anhidrosis.

Causes
The causes are the following:

Diagnosis
Sweat is readily visualized by a topical indicator such as iodinated starch (Minor test) or sodium alizarin sulphonate, both of which undergo a dramatic colour change when moistened by sweat. A thermoregulatory sweat test can evaluate the body’s response to a thermal stimulus by inducing sweating through a hot box ⁄ room, thermal blanket or exercise. Failure of the topical indicator to undergo a colour change during thermoregulatory sweat testing indicates hypohidrosis, and further tests may be required to localize the lesion.

Magnetic resonance imaging of the brain and ⁄ or spinal cord is the best modality for evaluation when the lesion is suspected to be localized to the central nervous system.

Skin biopsies are useful when anhidrosis occurs as part of a dermatological disorder. Biopsy results may reveal the sweat gland destruction, necrosis or fibrosis, in addition to the findings of the primary dermatological disorder.

Management
The treatment options for hypohidrosis and anhidrosis are limited. Those with hypohidrosis should avoid drugs that can aggravate the condition (see "Medications", under ). They should limit activities that raise the core body temperature and if exercises are to be performed, they should be supervised and be performed in a cool, sheltered and well-ventilated environment. In instances where the cause is known, treatment should be directed at the primary pathology. In autoimmune diseases, such as Sjögren syndrome and systemic sclerosis, treatment of the underlying disease using immunosuppressive drugs may lead to improvement in hypohidrosis. In neurological diseases, the primary pathology is often irreversible. In these instances, prevention of further neurological damage, such as good glycaemic control in diabetes, is the cornerstone of management. In acquired generalized anhidrosis, spontaneous remission may be observed in some cases. Numerous cases have been reported to respond effectively to systemic corticosteroids. Although an optimum dose and regime has not been established, pulse methylprednisolone (up to 1000 mg/day) has been reported to have good effect.

Citations

General references
 http://www.mayoclinic.com/health/anhidrosis/DS01050
 

Body fluids
Excretion
Reflexes